Javier Julián Castañeda Pomposo (born 7 October 1967) is a Mexican politician from the National Action Party. From 2000 to 2003 he served as Deputy of the LVIII Legislature of the Mexican Congress representing Baja California.

References

1967 births
Living people
Politicians from Baja California
National Action Party (Mexico) politicians
20th-century Mexican politicians
21st-century Mexican politicians
Members of the Congress of Baja California
Deputies of the LXIV Legislature of Mexico
Members of the Chamber of Deputies (Mexico) for Baja California